Ocularia brunnea is a species of beetle in the family Cerambycidae. It was described by Karl Jordan in 1894.

Subspecies
 Ocularia brunnea brunnea Jordan, 1894
 Ocularia brunnea rufipes Breuning, 1969

References

Oculariini
Beetles described in 1894
Taxa named by Karl Jordan